The nineteenth season of the One Piece anime series was produced by Toei Animation, and directed by Toshinori Fukuzawa. The season began broadcasting in Japan on Fuji Television on April 9, 2017. Like the rest of the series, it follows the adventures of Monkey D. Luffy and his Straw Hat Pirates. It contains two story arcs.

The first story arc, called "Whole Cake Island", adapts material from the rest of the 82nd volume to the beginning of the 90th volume of the manga by Eiichiro Oda. It deals with Luffy and his small team rescuing Sanji from his arranged marriage to finalize a political alliance between his own family, the Vinsmokes, and Big Mom's family.

The second story arc, called "Reverie", adapts material from the rest of the 90th volume. It deals with the royals from across the globe gathering for the Reverie, a seven day conference to discuss matters that could affect the world.

Three pieces of theme music are used for this season.


Episode list

Home releases

Japanese

English

Reception 
Writing for Anime News Network, Sam Leach awarded the first two Reverie episodes a "B−" and "B" rating; Leach praised the character interactions, but described the lengthy flashback sequences as "disposable" and argued that at times the anime's pacing was not sympathetic to the manga material it adapted.

Notes

References 
General

Specific

2017 Japanese television seasons
2018 Japanese television seasons
2019 Japanese television seasons
One Piece seasons
One Piece episodes